The  is a professional wrestling championship that is being defended in various independent promotions in Japan. The title was originally created in 1993 by Frontier Martial-Arts Wrestling.

There have been a total of forty-five reigns spread over three lineages and shared among thirty-one different wrestlers. The current champion is Oji Shiiba who is in his first reign.

History
The title was created in 1993 by Frontier Martial-Arts Wrestling (FMW) and it stayed with FMW from its inception to mid-1999, when FMW retired it. In 1998, the title was renamed  with the launch of the FMW Unified Organization. It was considered a different title with a new lineage.

On May 31, 1999, Kodo Fuyuki became the FMW commissioner and withdrew the recognition of the title following the introduction of the WEW Single Championship which he awarded to himself on September 24. Yuhi Sano was then recognized as the first Independent World Junior Heavyweight Champion, in continuation of his FMW Junior Heavyweight Championship reign, thus starting a third lineage. Since then, the title has been defended in various Japanese promotions including Big Japan Wrestling, DDT Pro-Wrestling, Kaientai Dojo, Union Pro Wrestling, Osaka Pro Wrestling and Michinoku Pro Wrestling.

Even with the belt being dropped by FMW, the original title belt is still used, which bears the "FMW" name on it. In May 2010, a new championship belt was made, as Tarzan Goto's Super FMW promotion briefly revived the FMW Independent World Junior Heavyweight Championship to determine its final champion.

Reigns

Original Independent World Junior Heavyweight Championship

FMW Junior Heavyweight Championship

New Independent World Junior Heavyweight Championship

Combined reigns

{| class="wikitable sortable" style="text-align: center"
!Rank  || Wrestler || No. ofreigns || Combineddefenses || Combineddays
|-
!1
| || 3 || 27 || 1,018
|-
!2
| || 2 || 13 || 555
|-
!3
| || 1 || 11 || 503
|-
!4
| || 2 || 15 || 496
|-
!5
| Naoki Tanizaki  || 1 || 6 || 454
|-
!6
| || 2 || 5 || 411
|-
!7
| || 3 || 5 || 403
|-
!8
| || 1 || 7 || 374
|-
!9
| || 1 || 7 || 349
|-
!scope=row|10
| || 1 || 5 || style="background-color:#bbeeff"|
|-
!11
| || 2 || 3 || 319
|-
!12
| Arata || 1 || 5 || 310
|-
!13
| || 1 || 5 || 265
|-
!14
| || 1 || 5 || 261
|-
!15
| || 1 || 6 || 191
|-
!scope=row|16
| || 2 || 1 || style="background-color:#bbeeff"|
|-
!17
| || 1 || 3 || 161
|-
!18
| || 1 || 2 || 160
|-
!19
|Daigoro Kashiwa || 1 || 4 || 141
|-
!rowspan=2|20
| || 2 || 2 || 126
|-
|Asuka || 1 || 2 || 126
|-
!22
| || 2 || 2 || 111
|-
!rowspan=2|23
| || 1 || 1 || 87
|-
| || 1 || 5 || 87
|-
!25
|Madoka/Hagane Shinno || 2 || 0 || 63
|-
!26
| || 1 || 0 || 57
|-
!27
| || 1 || 1 || 52
|-
!28
| || 1 || 1 || 48
|-
!29
| || 1 || 0 || 27
|-
!30
|style="background-color:#FFE6BD"| Oji Shiiba † || 1 || 0 || +
|-
!31
| Shota || 1 || 2 || 20
|-

Footnotes

See also

AWA World Light Heavyweight Championship (predecessor, 1989–1992)
Dramatic Dream Team
Professional wrestling in Japan

References

External links
 Independent World Junior Heavyweight Championship

Big Japan Pro Wrestling championships
Junior heavyweight wrestling championships
DDT Pro-Wrestling championships
Frontier Martial-Arts Wrestling championships
Osaka Pro Wrestling championships
Michinoku Pro Wrestling championships
Battlarts championships